Manila, Open City (International Title: American Tank Force) is a 1968 war film written, produced, and directed by Eddie Romero about the Battle of Manila in World War II. The film was screened upon the launching of the National Film Archive of the Philippines in December 2011.

The film is in the public domain.

Plot
In the final days of World War II, Allied forces approach Manila. The occupying Japanese army turns on the locals.

Cast
Charito Solis as Sor Matilde
James Shigeta as Capt. Murakami
Alex Nicol as Col. Bergen
John Ashley as Morgan
Mario Montenegro as Marcos Liwag
Ric Rodrigo as Guerilla Commander
Vic Diaz as Col. Hamada
Ben Perez as Capt. Kondo
Nova Villa as a young girl
Eddie Garcia
Cachupoy

Production
The film was one of a series of war movies Romero made which featured American actors, others including Lost Battalion (1960), The Walls of Hell, The Ravagers, and The Raiders of Leyte Gulf. The film featured John Ashley who would team with Romeo on Brides of Blood and a series of other horror movies.

Romero says the production company imported Ashley and Alex Nicol, and it was on this film he met John Ashley.

See also 
 The Ravagers (film)
 The Walls of Hell
 Santiago! (film)
 Aguila (film)

References

External links

Manila, Open City at BFI
Complete copy of movie at Free Movies Cinema
Manila Open City at Letter Box DVD

1968 films
Philippine war films
Films set in Manila
Films shot in Manila
Films directed by Eddie Romero